Evelyn Großmann (born 16 July 1971) is a German former figure skater. She is the 1990 European champion and 1991 European silver medallist.

Career 
Born in Dresden, Saxony, East Germany, Großmann represented first East Germany (GDR) and later Germany after German reunification in 1990. She trained in Chemnitz, Saxony. Her coach was Jutta Müller.

Großmann became European champion in 1990 and won a silver medal at the 1991 Europeans.

In 1993, she changed her club and coach, choosing to skate for ERC Dresden but training in Oberstdorf. However, she never again qualified for international championships mainly due to many injuries.

Großmann worked as a coach in Oberstdorf in Bavaria. She is also an international figure skating judge for the ISU judging system, for which she has a license as a technical specialist.

Results

References
  Munzinger
  Schlossbergmuseum
  Dresdner Eislauf Club e.V.
  Turngemeinde 1859 Schwenningen
  RZ-online

Navigation 

1971 births
Living people
German female single skaters
International Skating Union technical specialists
European Figure Skating Championships medalists
Sportspeople from Dresden